Raúl Ruiz González–Riancho (born 13 February 1960) is a Spanish football fitness coach. From October to November 2018, he was the interim manager of Spartak Moscow.

Career
He started his career in Gimnástica de Torrelavega as physical trainer and assistant coach working alongside Manuel Preciado Rebolledo. After that he worked for Racing de Santander, Levante UD, and FC Rubin Kazan.

In February 2014, he signed a contract with the Ukrainian side FC Dynamo Kyiv as fitness coach and assistant for Serhii Rebrov. Here he worked until 30 June 2016.

On 15 July 2016, he was appointed as assistant coach of the Ukraine national football team to help the head coach Andriy Shevchenko.

References

External links
 

1960 births
Living people
Spanish football managers
Spanish expatriate football managers
Expatriate football managers in Russia
Expatriate football managers in Ukraine
Spanish expatriate sportspeople in Russia
Spanish expatriate sportspeople in Ukraine
FC Spartak Moscow managers
Russian Premier League managers
Strength and conditioning coaches